Franz Graßl (born 7 March 1965) is a German ski mountaineer.

Graßl was born in Berchtesgaden. He is member of the Berchtesgaden branch of the German Alpine Club (DAV) and the Bergwacht. He was member of the German ski-mountaineering team until the end of 2006. He is married to the ski mountaineer Judith Graßl with two children. They live in Ramsau bei Berchtesgaden.

Selected results 
 2003:
 2nd, German Championship single
 2004: 
 1st, German Championship single
 2nd, German Cup long distance
 5th, Mountain Attack race
 2005:
3rd, European Championship relay race (together with Toni Steurer, Stefan Klinger and Georg Nickaes)
 9th, European Championship team race (together with Toni Steurer)
 10th, Trofeo Mezzalama (together with Wolfgang Panzer and Martin Echtler)
 2006:
 1st, German Cup single
 5th, World Championship relay race (together with Toni Steurer, Stefan Klinger and Georg Nickaes)
 2008:
 1st, German Championship single
 2009:
 3rd, German Cup vertical race

Patrouille des Glaciers 

 2006: 7th (and 2nd "seniors II" ranking) as well as German record, together with Toni Steurer and Martin Echtler
2008: 8th (and 6th in the "international men" ranking), together with Toni Steurer and Stefan Klinger

References

External links 
 Franz Graßl at skimountaineering.com

1965 births
Living people
German male ski mountaineers
People from Berchtesgaden
Sportspeople from Upper Bavaria